Robert Earl Lickliter is an American developmental psychologist and professor at Florida International University. He is known for researching the development of intersensory perception and selective attention in humans and other animals. He is a fellow of the Association for Psychological Science and the Society for Behavioral Neuroscience and Comparative Psychology.

References

External links
Faculty page

Living people
American developmental psychologists
21st-century American psychologists
Florida International University faculty
University of California, Davis alumni
Virginia Tech faculty
American neuroscientists
Fellows of the Association for Psychological Science
Year of birth missing (living people)